Americans in North Korea consist mainly of defectors and prisoners of war during and after the Korean War, as well as their locally born descendants. Additionally, there are occasional tours and group travel which consists of Americans via train or plane from China, some with temporal lodging and stay.

Prisoners of war
On September 17, 1996, The New York Times reported the possible presence of American POWs in North Korea, citing declassified documents. The documents showed that the U.S. Defense Department knew in December 1953 that "more than 900 American troops were alive at the end of the war but were never released by the North Koreans". The Pentagon did not confirm the report, saying it had no clear evidence that any Americans were being held against their will in North Korea but pledged to continue to investigate accounts of defectors and others who said they had seen American prisoners there. The North Korean government has said it is not holding any Americans.

Notable people

Korean War

Operation Big Switch, the exchange of remaining prisoners of war, commenced in early August 1953 and lasted into December. During that period, some 21 American soldiers refused to return to their homeland and decided to stay in the country (along with one British soldier and 327 South Koreans).

Notable defectors
Anna Wallis Suh (1950, died 1969.)
Larry Allen Abshier (1962, died 1983.)
James Joseph Dresnok (1962, died 2016.)
Jerry Wayne Parrish (1963, died 1998.)
Charles Robert Jenkins (1965, left North Korea in 2004, died 2017.)
Roy Chung (1979, died 2004.)
Joseph T. White (1982, died 1985.)

See also
 2009 imprisonment of American journalists by North Korea
 Foreign Account Tax Compliance Act
 List of Americans detained by North Korea

References

 
North Korea
Demographics of North Korea
Americans